Shawano (pronounced SHAW-no) is a city in Shawano County, Wisconsin, United States. The population was 9,305 at the 2010 census. It is the county seat of Shawano County.

Geography

Demographics

2010 census
As of the census of 2010, there were 9,305 people, 3,960 households, and 2,299 families residing in the city. The racial makeup of the city was 82.4% White, 0.7% African American, 12.3% Native American, 0.4% Asian, 0.1% Pacific Islander, 1.2% from other races, and 2.8% from two or more races. Hispanic or Latino of any race were 3.1% of the population.

There were 3,960 households, of which 28.9% had children under the age of 18 living with them, 40.7% were married couples living together, 12.6% had a female householder with no husband present, 4.8% had a male householder with no wife present, and 41.9% were non-families. 35.6% of all households were made up of individuals, and 17% had someone living alone who was 65 years of age or older. The average household size was 2.24 and the average family size was 2.89.

The median age in the city was 39.8 years. 23% of residents were under the age of 18; 8.1% were between the ages of 18 and 24; 25.3% were from 25 to 44; 23.8% were from 45 to 64; and 19.8% were 65 years of age or older. The gender makeup of the city was 47.2% male and 52.8% female.

2000 census
As of the census of 2000, there were 8,298 people, 3,432 households, and 2,076 families residing in the city. The racial makeup of the city was 89.03% White, 0.33% African American, 7.88% Native American, 0.54% Asian, 0.12% Pacific Islander, 0.55% from other races, and 1.54% from two or more races. Hispanic or Latino of any race were 1.61% of the population.

There were 3,432 households, out of which 29.0% had children under the age of 18 living with them, 45.8% were married couples living together, 11.2% had a female householder with no husband present, and 39.5% were non-families. 34.7% of all households were made up of individuals, and 18.2% had someone living alone who was 65 years of age or older. The average household size was 2.27 and the average family size was 2.91.

24.0% of the population was under the age of 18, 7.9% from 18 to 24, 27.7% from 25 to 44, 19.8% from 45 to 64, and 20.5% who were 65 years of age or older. The median age was 38 years. For every 100 females, there were 91.0 males. For every 100 females age 18 and over, there were 86.9 males.

The median income for a household in the city was $31,546, and the median income for a family was $41,241. Males had a median income of $30,709 versus $19,905 for females. The per capita income for the city was $17,380. About 8.9% of families and 9.9% of the population were below the poverty line, including 11.4% of those under age 18 and 12.1% of those age 65 or over.

Economy
The Wisconsin Towns Association has its headquarters in Shawano.

Shawano is a member of Shawano County Economic Progress, a countywide economic development organization.

Infrastructure

Major highways

Airport
The city and county jointly operate the Shawano Municipal Airport (KEZS) which is located on Shawano Lake.

Notable people

 George E. Beedle — Wisconsin State Representative, was born in Shawano.
 Henry Albert Brauer — Wisconsin State Representative, lived in Shawano.
 Robert W. Cone — United States Army General, lived in Shawano.
 Walter J. Dolan — Wisconsin State Representative, lived in Shawano. 
 Evelyn Frechette — love and accomplice of John Dillinger, lived in Shawano.
 George Grimmer — Wisconsin State Senator, lived in Shawano.
 William Horvath — Wisconsin State Representative and conservationist, born in Shawano.
 Frank W. Humphrey — Wisconsin State Representative, lived in Shawano.
 John David Kast — Wisconsin State Representative, lived in Shawano.
 Antone Kuckuk — Wisconsin State Senator, was a member of the Shawano School Board.
 George W. Latta — Wisconsin State Representative and lawyer, lived in Shawano.
 Daniel P. Leaf — U.S. Air Force Lieutenant General, former Commander of United States Pacific Command.
 Louis Leroy — MLB player, lived in Shawano.
 Joseph McCarthy once worked here as a lawyer in the 1930s. He was also a circuit court judge.
 Myron Hawley McCord — U.S. Representative, lived in Shawano.
 Herman Naber — Wisconsin State Representative, lived in and was mayor of Shawano 
 Dan Neumeier — MLB player, was born in Shawano.
 Daniel H. Pulcifer — Wisconsin State Representative, lived in and was mayor of Shawano
 Billy Reed — MLB player, was born in Shawano.
 Lee Remmel — NFL historian, was born and raised in Shawano.
 Michael J. Wallrich — Wisconsin State Representative, lived in and was Mayor of Shawano.
 King Weeman — Wisconsin State Representative, lived in and was Mayor of Shawano.
 Otto Oscar Wiegand — Wisconsin State Representative, lived in Shawano.

References

External links

 City of Shawano
 Sanborn fire insurance maps: 1894 1901 1907 1913

Cities in Wisconsin
Cities in Shawano County, Wisconsin
County seats in Wisconsin